Elcho Park is a soccer facility located on Gibbons Road in Lara, Victoria, a northern suburb of Geelong.

It is owned privately by the Australian Croatian Soccer Association Geelong. The tenants of the facility are National Premier Leagues Victoria side North Geelong Warriors FC and Geelong Regional Football Association based club Elcho Park Cardinals FC.

North Geelong Warriors played their first season out of Elcho Park in 1986. The first competitive league game at the venue was a 3–3 draw between North Geelong and Essendon City on 29 March 1986.

The main grandstand, which is situated between the clubrooms and the pitch, seats about 200 people. The total capacity of the facility is much larger, with an abundance of standing room all around the main pitch. Added to the main pitch, there is also a second pitch and over 100 parking spaces inside the facility. Both of the pitches are grass surfaces.

In 2015, it was announced that the facility would be receiving $283,000 in council and state funding to upgrade the change rooms. It was the first time the privately owned facility had been granted public funds.

External links
North Geelong Warriors

References

Soccer venues in Victoria (Australia)
Sport in Geelong
Buildings and structures in Geelong
1986 establishments in Australia